Rebecca Momin is a Bangladesh Awami League politician and Member of Parliament.

Biography
Rebecca Momin was born on 15 May 1947 in Mohanganj, Netrokona, East Bengal, British Raj. She was elected to parliament in January 2009 Bangladesh General Elections as a candidate of Bangladesh Awami League from Netrokona-4 in Netrokona District. Rebecca Momin was reelected to parliament in January 2014 Bangladesh General Elections as a candidate of Bangladesh Awami League from Netrokona-4. She was one of 17 woman elected to Parliament that year.

Rebecca Momin is the chair of Parliamentary Standing Committee on the Ministry of Women and Children Affairs. She has controversially defended the government law lowering of the marriage age in Bangladesh from 18 to 16. She has stated that in certain cases of teen pregnancy the girl can be married to prevent social stigma. While her opponents have argued that less than two percent young girls marry due to unplanned pregnancy. She has said that she personally does not support the lowering of the marriage age but cannot do anything as the Prime Minister, Sheikh Hasina, is also in charge of the Ministry of Women and Children Affairs. She faced criticism in December 2014 after saying the reason behind increasing rape in Bangladesh was women's clothes and their ability to travel outside homes.

References

Awami League politicians
Living people
10th Jatiya Sangsad members
1947 births
People from Netrokona District
11th Jatiya Sangsad members